Doleschalla is a genus of bristle flies in the family Tachinidae.

Species
Doleschalla consobrina Bigot, 1888
Doleschalla cylindrica (Walker, 1861)
Doleschalla elongata (Wulp, 1885)
Doleschalla maculifera Bigot, 1888
Doleschalla makilingensis Townsend, 1928
Doleschalla nigra Bigot, 1888
Doleschalla papua (Townsend, 1933)
Doleschalla parallela (Walker, 1862)
Doleschalla picta Bigot, 1888
Doleschalla solomonensis Baranov, 1934
Doleschalla tenuis Malloch, 1932

References

Dexiinae
Taxa named by Francis Walker (entomologist)
Diptera of Australasia
Diptera of Asia
Tachinidae genera